Diff'rent Strokes is an American sitcom that aired on NBC from November 3, 1978 to May 4, 1985 and ABC from September 27, 1985 to March 7, 1986. This list includes synopses and air dates. Episodes are in original U.S. airdate order; some syndication and overseas airings have varied the running order. Some markets, such as U.K. satellite channel Sky One in the early 1990s, have aired the episodes in production order.

Series overview
All eight seasons have been released on DVD, with the final season released on May 29, 2018.

Episodes

Season 1 (1978–79)

Season 2 (1979–80)

Season 3 (1980–81)

Season 4 (1981–82)

Season 5 (1982–83)

Season 6 (1983–84)

Season 7 (1984–85)

Season 8 (1985–86)

See also
 List of Hello, Larry episodes
 List of The Facts of Life episodes

References

External links

1970s television-related lists
1980s television-related lists
Lists of American sitcom episodes